Where Sinners Meet is a 1934 American  pre-Code romantic comedy film directed by J. Walter Ruben and starring Diana Wynyard, Clive Brook and Billie Burke. It was adapted by writer Henry William Hanemann from Clara Beranger's 1927 movie The Little Adventuress, which in turn was a rewrite from the 1921 British play The Dover Road by A. A. Milne. The film used The Dover Road as a working title prior to its release.

The film's sets were designed by the art directors Perry Ferguson and Van Nest Polglase.

Plot
Leonard and Anne drive along the lovers' road to Dover, intending to embark for Calais and go to Paris. The car breaks down and Saunders takes them to a nearby hotel, which turns out to be a residence with servants, owned by a Mr. Latimer. They are told they cannot leave for seven days so that they can see if a marriage between them will work. The next day, Anne begins to notice things about Leonard that she ignored before. Another couple in the house are about to leave after seven days—Leonard's wife Eustasia and her lover Nicholas.

Cast
 Diana Wynyard as Anne
 Clive Brook as Mr. Latimer
 Billie Burke as Eustasia
 Reginald Owen as Leonard
 Alan Mowbray as Nicholas
 Gilbert Emery as Dominic
 Phyllis Barry as Chambermaid
 Walter Armitage as Joseph
 Katherine Williams as Chambermaid
 Robert Adair as Jacob
 Vernon Steele as Saunders

References

External links

Where Sinners Meet at British Film Institute

1934 films
1934 romantic comedy films
1930s English-language films
American films based on plays
Films based on works by A. A. Milne
Films set in England
Films directed by J. Walter Ruben
American romantic comedy films
American black-and-white films
RKO Pictures films
1930s American films